Homoranthus cernuus is a flowering plant in the family Myrtaceae and is endemic to a small area in the Wollemi National Park. It is a slender shrub with smooth, linear shaped leaves and pairs of pendulous  cream-coloured flowers with a pinkish base.

Description
The leaves are arranged in crowded, opposite pairs, either terete or laterally compressed and tapering at the apex and narrowing toward the short leaf stalk. The small bracts are thin, dry and cover the flower bud and remain until the flower petals are fully opened. Flowers and fruits sporadically throughout the year but primarily in spring and summer. This species is closely related to H. darwinoides but has longer leaves and larger flowers.

Taxonomy
Homoranthus cernuus   was first formally described in 1889 by Richard Thomas Baker who gave it the name Rylstonea cernua from a specimen collected from Mount Coricudgy. The description was published in Proceedings of the Linnean Society of New South Wales. In 1991 Lyndley Craven and S.R.Jones changed the name to Homoranthus cernuus and the name change was published in  Australian Systematic Botany.

Distribution and habitat
This species has a restricted distribution and is endemic to the north-western section of Wollemi National Park in central New South Wales.  It occurs on Narabeen sandstone, shallow sandy soils in layered woodland or heath, usually on steep rocky terrain in dry open forests.

Conservation status
Uncommon and restricted in distribution, but well reserved in Wollemi National Park. Listed as a rare species by Briggs and Leigh (1996) with a ROTAP conservation 2RCa.

References

External links
 The Australasian Virtual Herbarium – Occurrence data for Homoranthus cernuus

cernuus
Flora of New South Wales
Myrtales of Australia
Plants described in 1889